Olds may refer to:

People
 The olds, a jocular and irreverent online nickname for older adults
 Bert Olds (1891–1953), Australian rules footballer
 Carl D. Olds (1912–1979), New Zealand-born American mathematician
 Chauncey N. Olds (1816–1890), American politician
 Edson B. Olds (1802–1869), American politician
 Elizabeth Olds (1896–1991), American printmaker
 Gabriel Olds (born 1972), American actor
 Gamaliel S. Olds (1777–1848), American Congregationalist minister
 George Olds (1853–1931), American academic administrator
 Glenn Olds (1921–2006), American academic administrator and politician
 Irving S. Olds (1887–1963), American lawyer and philanthropist
 James Olds (1922–1976), American psychologist and neuroscientist
 James Olds (bass) (born 1986), Australian opera singer
 Leland Olds (1890–1960), American economist
 Lewis P. Olds, American lawyer, politician, and diplomat
 Ollie Olds (born 1993), Welsh rugby league footballer
 Peter Olds (born 1944), New Zealand poet
 Ransom E. Olds (1864–1950), American automobile industry pioneer and namesake of the former Oldsmobile and REO brands 
 Robert Olds (1896-1943), general officer in the United States Army Air Forces
 Robert E. Olds (1875-1932), American diplomat and lawyer
 Robin Olds (1922-2007), American fighter pilot
 Sharon Olds (born 1942), American poet
 Shelley Olds (born 1980), American racing cyclist
 Wally Olds (1949–2009), American ice hockey player
 Walter Olds (1846-1925), American judge
 W. B. Olds (1874–1948), American composer and scholar

Places
 Olds, Alberta, Canada
 Olds, Iowa, United States
 Olds Peak, Antarctica

Other uses 
 F. E. Olds, an American brass musical instrument manufacturing company
 Olds College, in Olds, Alberta
 Oldsmobile, an American automobile brand

See also
 Old (disambiguation)
 Olde, a list of people with the surname